The New Zealand women's national cricket team toured Australia in January and February 1972. They played against Australia in one Test match, which they won by 143 runs. The tour preceded New Zealand's tour of South Africa.

Squads

Tour Matches

2-day match: New South Wales Under-25s v New Zealand

1-day single innings match: North Harbour v New Zealand

1-day single innings match: South Harbour v New Zealand

2-day match: New South Wales v New Zealand

1-day match: Australian Women's Cricket Council President's XI v New Zealand

2-day match: South Australia Junior v New Zealand

2-day match: South Australia v New Zealand

2-day match: South Australia v New Zealand

45-over match: South Australia Junior v New Zealand

2-day match: Victoria Invitation XI v New Zealand

2-day match: Victoria Invitation XI v New Zealand

40-over match: Victoria Junior v New Zealand

2-day match: Western Australia v New Zealand

40-over match: Australian Women's Cricket Council President's XI v New Zealand

WTest Series

1st Test

References

External links
New Zealand Women tour of Australia 1971/72 from Cricinfo

Women's international cricket tours of Australia
1972 in Australian cricket
New Zealand women's national cricket team tours